Nasser Al-Duwailah was a member of the Kuwaiti National Assembly, representing the fourth district. Born in 1956, Al-Duwailah studied military science and sharia law and worked as a lawyer and army commander before being elected to the National Assembly in 2008.  While political parties are technically illegal in Kuwait, Al-Duwailah affiliates with the Islamist deputies.  He is a member of the Al-Rashaydah tribe.

Supports Project Kuwait
 Al-Duwailah supports Project Kuwait.

References

Kuwaiti people of Arab descent
Members of the National Assembly (Kuwait)
Living people
1956 births
Place of birth missing (living people)